Charlie Vernon is an Irish Gaelic footballer who plays for the Armagh county team, and joint head of the Loch An Iuir PE Department. He captained the Under-21 team in the 2007 season. He has a Sigerson Cup Runners Up and winners medal during his time as a player on the Queen's University Team losing in 2006 to DCU in Parnell Park and winning in 2007 at QUB playing fields, The Dub.  He made his Championship debut on 15 June 2008 against Cavan, scoring a point.  Armagh was without his services for the start of the 2009 Ulster SFC opener because he suffered broken jaw against Dublin. Charlie retired from Armagh in 2019.

Peil Star Street Gaelic Football
In 2017, Vernon appeared in a Street Gaelic Football film Peil's Poc, created by Peil Star with Michael Murphy from Donegal. 

The film was shot in Omagh, Co. Tyrone for the BBC.

Honours
 Ulster Senior Football Championship (2): 2006, 2008
 Ulster Under-21 Football Championship (1): 2007 (C)
 Sigerson Cup (1): 2007
 Ulster Minor Football Championship (1): 2005

 Armagh Under-21 Football Championship(1): 2005

 Armagh Minor Football Championship (1) 2003
Ulster Minor Club Football Championship (1) 2003

 Armagh Senior Football Championship: 1 (2017)
O'fiach Cup (1) 2016
Armagh Senior Division 1A League Title (1) 2022

References

1987 births
Living people
Armagh Harps Gaelic footballers
Armagh inter-county Gaelic footballers
People educated at St Patrick's Grammar School, Armagh